Rita is a genus of fish in the family Bagridae found in South Asia. These species have a single pair of mandibular barbels, an elongated Weberian apparatus firmly sutured to the basioccipital and the sensory canal on the posttemporal enclosed with bone.

Species
There are currently 7 recognized species in this genus:
 Rita bakalu K. K. Lal, Dwivedi & R. K. Singh, 2016 
 Rita chrysea F. Day, 1877
 Rita gogra (Sykes, 1839)
 Rita kuturnee (Sykes, 1839)
 Rita macracanthus H. H. Ng, 2004
 Rita rita (F. Hamilton, 1822) 
 Rita sacerdotum J. Anderson, 1879

References

Bagridae
Fish of South Asia
Freshwater fish genera
Taxa named by Pieter Bleeker
Catfish genera